Altore Wedge Tomb is a wedge-shaped gallery grave and National Monument located in County Roscommon, Ireland.

Location

History

Altore Wedge Tomb was built c. 2500–2000 BC.

Description

The entrance faces south and is flanked by  facade stones. A roofstone spans the entrance.

References

National Monuments in County Roscommon
Archaeological sites in County Roscommon
Tombs in the Republic of Ireland